The 2018 Giro dell'Emilia was the 101st edition of the Giro dell'Emilia road cycling one day race. It was held on 6 October 2018 as part of the 2018 UCI Europe Tour in category 1.HC.

Teams
Twenty-five teams of up to seven riders started the race:

UCI WorldTeams

 
 
 
 
 
 
 
 
 
 
 
 
 

UCI Professional Continental teams

 
 
 
 
 
 
 

UCI Continental Teams

 
 
 
 

National Teams

 Italy

Results

References 

Giro dell'Emilia
Giro dell'Emilia
Giro dell'Emilia